Per il gusto di uccidere (internationally released as Taste of Killing, Lanky Fellow and For the Taste of Killing and originally titled as Cacciatore di taglie) is the 1966 Italian Spaghetti Western film debut directed by Tonino Valerii. It is also the first film to use the camera system known as 2P. It was filmed in Almería. It is produced by Francesco Genesi, Vincenzo Genesi, Daniele Senatore, Stefano Melpignano and Jose Lopez Moreno, scored by Nico Massi and edited by Rosa G. Salgado.

Plot
At the start of the story the band of Sanchez ambushes a military transport escorting $100,000 to Omaha. He leaves together with two men to take the money to Mexico, while the other gang members dress in the uniforms of the dead soldiers and continue the transport, to use this as a cover to enter and rob the bank of Omaha. This nifty plan is undone by the bounty hunter Hank Fellow, who has been watching the attack in the telescopic sight of his rifle – without firing or otherwise interfering. He then takes his time following Sanchez’ group, unnerving the men with some long range pot shots, before confronting and killing them in a stand up gunfight at close range. Then he hurries back to warn the town, and the ”soldiers” are ambushed at the bank and killed, most of them by Fellows himself.

The mine owner Collins, who urgently needs to ship a load of gold past the dangerous gang of Gus Kennebeck, suggests a deal – Fellows cuts up his 10% reward as an insurance, and gets the double amount back if he manages to get the gold to Omaha and keep it there until a military escort picks it up. Fellows accepts, and when Kennebeck’s gang waits in ambush, the bounty killer picks off a few of them, which makes Kennebeck hold off the attack. At night Fellows has the gold taken away from the bank, and refuses to tell Collins where it is. The same night he has observed Kennebeck visiting a woman in town, Isabelle, and the next day he captures Kennebeck’s captain Machete after a visit there. The sheriff and his men beat up Machete until he confesses to them that Isabelle is Kennebeck’s woman, and when the gang will attack.

When the bandits attack, Fellows blows up a bridge on their way to town. They attack from other directions against the citizens waiting in prepared positions. After a lot of casualties on both sides the bandits reach the bank and make their way into the vault, where Fellows has prepared a barrel of explosives connected to the telegraph line. When a signal is given that they are inside, Fellows orders the telegraph operator to start sending, and the remaining bandits are killed in an explosion.

Kennebeck did not take part in the attack, but when he learns about the outcome he arrives to fight Fellows. He challenges him to drop the rifle with the telescopic sight. When his two remaining men appear, and are killed before they can shoot, Kennebeck goes for that rifle but is shot by Fellows through the sight.

When the military troop arrives the banker discloses that the gold has been disguised as the new stairs of the bank. Fellows is paid and leaves. On the road he observes the military transport being ambushed by another gang of bandits, and grins.

Cast 
 Craig Hill as Hank Fellows
 George Martin as Gus Kennebeck
 Piero Lulli as Collins
 Fernando Sancho as Sánchez
 Rada Rassimov as Isabel
 Franco Ressel as Aarons
 José Manuel Martín as Rodrigo
 George Wang as Mingo / Machete
 Diana Martín as Peggy / Molly Kennebeck
 Graham Sooty as Jefferson
 José Marco as John Kennebeck
 Lorenzo Robledo as Sheriff
 Sancho Gracia as Bill Kilpatrick
 José Canalejas as Peter
 Dario De Grasi as Steve
 Enrique Santiago as Sanchez henchman
 Frank Braña
 Olga Karlatos as Molly

Release
Per il gusto di uccidere was released in Italy on June 8, 1966 where it was distributed by Titanus. The film grossed a total of 495.449 million Italian lire in Italy.

Reception
In his investigation of narrative structures in Spaghetti Western films, Fridlund writes that Per il gusto di uccidere, unlike influential Spaghetti Western films like For a Few Dollars More or Django, presents a protagonist who is always in control. The developments never put him at the mercy of any villain, so he is never subject to torture. He does not go out of his way to pursue a second motive, and his choices do not put any loved ones of his in danger. However, these kinds of complications are not missing, but instead befall other characters in the story.

Releases
Wild East released this on an out-of-print limited edition R0 NTSC DVD in 2006

References

Bibliography

External links

1966 films
Italian Western (genre) films
Spanish Western (genre) films
Spaghetti Western films
1966 Western (genre) films
Films directed by Tonino Valerii
Films shot in Almería
Films scored by Nico Fidenco
1966 directorial debut films
1960s Italian films